Antonio de los Reyes Correa (c. 1665 – June 9, 1758), also known as El Capitán Correa, was a Puerto Rican native who served as a Captain in the Spanish Army. Correa and his men defended the town of Arecibo from a British invasion in 1702.

Early years
Correa was born in Arecibo, Puerto Rico, to Jose Rodriguez Correa and Francisca Rodriguez y de Valdés. He was in charge of a small militia whose job was to protect the city of Arecibo from any attack which the city may be subject to, either by pirates or foreign forces. His claim to fame came as a result of his defense of the city from an attack and possible invasion by the British on August 5, 1702.

Defense of Arecibo
During the early part of the 18th century the United Kingdom was at war with Spain, and Great Britain ordered an attack on the Spanish possessions in the New World.  On August 5, 1702, two British warships approached the coastal town of Arecibo.  Two smaller boats with a company of British soldiers landed on Arecibo's beach.  The Puerto Rican militia - headed by Correa - had only thirty men, armed with just spears and machetes, who fought the British, who were better armed with muskets and swords.  At the end of the battle there were twenty-two British dead on land and 8 at sea, including the captain in charge of the landing troops, who had died at the hands of Correa. Correa himself was wounded but the British left and the city of Arecibo was saved. As a result Correa was declared a Puerto Rican national hero.

Honors and later years

Correa was awarded "La Medalla de Oro de la Real Efigie" (The Gold Medal of the Royal Image), by King Philip V of Spain and given the title of "Captain of Infantry" on September 23, 1703. It was within Spanish tradition to name its Captain of Infantry to the position of Mayor. Correa served as temporary mayor of Arecibo from  1700 to 1701 and then as official mayor from 1701 to 1705. He also served as mayor from 1710 to 1714 and from 1716 to 1744.

Capt. Antonio de los Reyes Correa, who was married to Estephanía Rodríguez de Matos y Colón, died on June 9, 1758. She was the daughter of Capitan Nicolás Rodríguez de Matos II and María Colón de Luyando. She died in 1718 in Arecibo. She was a descendant of Christopher Columbus and Adeltanado Don Pedro de Alvarado the conquistador of Mexico and Guatemala. We know this thanks to her daughter Francisca de los Reyes Correa y Rodríguez de Matos married Juan Blás Sánchez de Matos y Colón in August 16th 1717 in Arecibo. He was the son of Capitan Pedro Sánchez de Matos a mayor of Ponce and his 3rd wife María Colón. They were 4th grade of consanguinity [ARE1M F15v] and [A.G.I.INDIFERENTE,220,N.7] Juan Blás's brother Father Juan Lorenzo de Matos y Colón declared he was a descendant to Christopher Columbus and Adeltanado Pedro de Alvarado. 

As in of Arecibo is known as the "Villa del Capitan Correa" (Captain Correa's Village), an honor bestowed by the people of the town. The people of Arecibo also honored Correa by including a gold colored belt in their Coat of Arms with the words "Muy Leal", which means "Very Loyal", in representation of Correa. On January 8, 2004, the Government of Puerto Rico approved public law #29 (P. de la C. 4029 LEY NUM. 29. 8 DE ENERO DE 2004) establishing August 5 as the Day of Antonio de los Reyes Correa. In the southern Puerto Rican city of Ponce a street was named after him. It runs from Barrio Segundo through Barrio Primero and ends in the northern portion of Barrio Canas Urbano at Avenida Las Américas.

See also

List of Puerto Ricans
List of Puerto Rican military personnel

References

External links
 One of the earliest works of Puerto Rican literature, features a poem "" 

Captain Correa

1665 births
1758 deaths
Puerto Rican Army personnel
People from Arecibo, Puerto Rico
Puerto Rican military officers
17th-century Puerto Rican people
18th-century Puerto Rican people
Colonial Puerto Rico